Sergei Mikhailovich Makarov (born 19 June 1958) is a Russian former ice hockey right wing and two-time Olympic gold medalist. He was voted one of six players to the International Ice Hockey Federation's (IIHF) Centennial All-Star Team in a poll conducted by a group of 56 experts from 16 countries.

Career

Makarov was trained in the Russian SFSR. He won two World Junior Championships, and was named the best player during his second victory in 1978. Makarov was also on the gold-winning Soviet national ice hockey team in the World Championships in 1978, 1979, 1981, 1982, 1983, 1986, 1989 and 1990 and in the Canada Cup in 1981. At the Winter Olympics, he won the gold medal in 1984 and 1988 and a silver in 1980 as a member of the USSR team. In the Soviet Union, Makarov played 11 championship seasons with CSKA Moscow (Red Army), winning the Soviet Player of the Year award (also known as Soviet MVP) three times, getting named to the Soviet League All-Star Team ten times, and leading the league in points nine times and goals three times. Together with Igor Larionov and Vladimir Krutov, they formed the KLM Line, one of the most talented and feared lines ever to play hockey. He was awarded Order of the Red Banner of Labour (1984).

In 1989, Makarov was allowed by the Soviet Union to join the National Hockey League and the Calgary Flames. He won the Calder Memorial Trophy as rookie of the year at the age of 31 (as a result, the rules were changed and now only players under 26 qualify for the award – the Makarov Rule). At 25.9% his shooting percentage was the highest of all NHL players.  Makarov also played for the San Jose Sharks from 1993 to 1995. For the 1995–96 season Makarov was dropped from the Sharks' roster and did not play and became an assistant coach for the Russian national team during the World Cup.

In the 1996–97 season, Makarov made two comeback attempts, first with the Dallas Stars, for whom he played four games between 15–29 November, followed by playing for HC Fribourg-Gottéron in Switzerland's Nationalliga A with former teammates Vyacheslav Bykov and Andrei Khomutov.

In 2001, Makarov was inducted into the IIHF Hall of Fame during the Ice Hockey World Championship in Germany. On 27 June 2016, it was announced that he would be inducted into the Hockey Hall of Fame on 14 November 2016 along with Eric Lindros, Rogie Vachon and Pat Quinn (posthumously).

Personal life
After separating from his first wife Vera (son Artie) in Calgary, he met Mary, who had worked for the San Jose Sharks in the ticket sales. They married and had two children, Nikolai and Katerina.

Makarov is again divorced, and is living in Russia. His ex-wife and children, son Nik and daughter Katerina, still live in California. Makarov still works as a certified player agent who acts as a liaison for young Russians wanting to play in North America.

Career statistics

Regular season and playoffs

International

References

External links
 
 Sergey Makarov at Hockey CCCP International

1958 births
Living people
Calder Trophy winners
Calgary Flames draft picks
Calgary Flames players
Dallas Stars players
HC CSKA Moscow players
HC Fribourg-Gottéron players
Hockey Hall of Fame inductees
Ice hockey players at the 1980 Winter Olympics
Ice hockey players at the 1984 Winter Olympics
Ice hockey players at the 1988 Winter Olympics
IIHF Hall of Fame inductees
Medalists at the 1980 Winter Olympics
Medalists at the 1984 Winter Olympics
Medalists at the 1988 Winter Olympics
Olympic gold medalists for the Soviet Union
Olympic ice hockey players of the Soviet Union
Olympic medalists in ice hockey
Olympic silver medalists for the Soviet Union
Sportspeople from Chelyabinsk
Russian ice hockey right wingers
San Jose Sharks players
Soviet expatriate ice hockey players
Soviet expatriate sportspeople in Canada
Soviet ice hockey right wingers
Traktor Chelyabinsk players
Honoured Masters of Sport of the USSR
Recipients of the Order of Friendship of Peoples
Expatriate ice hockey players in Canada
Russian expatriate sportspeople in the United States
Russian expatriate ice hockey people
Expatriate ice hockey players in the United States
Russian expatriate sportspeople in Canada
Russian expatriate sportspeople in Switzerland
Expatriate ice hockey players in Switzerland